This is the discography of American DJ and producer Andrew Bayer. Bayer has released five studio albums, six extended plays, 30 singles, 12 remixes, and eight music videos. Under Artificial, he has released two singles. Under Signalrunners, Bayer has released one extended play, 10 singles, and 12 remixes.

Studio albums

Compilation albums

Extended plays

As lead artist

As Signalrunners

Singles

As lead artist

As Artificial

As Signalrunners

Remixes

As lead artist

As Signalrunners

Music videos

References

Discographies of American artists
Electronic music discographies